Minol (pronounced mine-ol) is a military explosive developed by the Admiralty early in the Second World War to augment supplies of trinitrotoluene (TNT) and RDX, which were in short supply.  The aluminium component in Minol significantly prolongs the explosive pulse, making it ideal for use in underwater naval weapons (e.g. naval mines, for which it was developed, depth charges and torpedoes) where munitions with a longer explosive pulse are more destructive than those with high brisance. Minol cannot be used in weapons fired from gun barrels (e.g. artillery shells) because there is a risk of detonation when subjected to over 250 gs of acceleration. Typically, four Minol formulas were used.  All percentages shown are by weight:
 Minol-1: 48% TNT, 42% ammonium nitrate and 10% powdered aluminium
 Minol-2: 40% TNT, 40% ammonium nitrate and 20% powdered aluminium
 Minol-3: 42% TNT, 38% ammonium nitrate and 20% powdered aluminium
 Minol-4: 40% TNT, 36% ammonium nitrate, 4% potassium nitrate and 20% powdered aluminium

Since the 1950s, Minol has been superseded by more modern PBX compositions, due to their superior explosive yield and stability when being stored; Minol is regarded as obsolete. Generally, any Minol-filled munitions encountered will be in the form of legacy munitions or unexploded ordnance dating from before the 1960s.

See also
 Amatol
 Composition H6
 Hexanite
 Torpex
 Tritonal

References

British inventions
Explosives